The Peña Bilouis is a French aerobatic amateur-built aircraft that was designed by the competitive aerobatic pilot Louis Peña of Dax, Landes and made available in the form of plans for amateur construction.

Design and development
The Bilouis is a development of the single-seat Peña Capeña and like the Capeña is aerobatic. It features a cantilever low-wing, a two-seats-in-tandem enclosed cockpit under a bubble canopy, fixed conventional landing gear and a single engine in tractor configuration.

The Bilouis is made from wood. The standard recommended engines are the  Lycoming O-360 and the fuel-injected  Lycoming IO-360 four-stroke powerplants.

Specifications (Bilouis)

References

External links

Homebuilt aircraft
Single-engined tractor aircraft
Aerobatic aircraft